Julio César Britos Vázquez (18 May 1926 –  27 March 1998) was an Uruguayan footballer, who played for CA Peñarol and Real Madrid.

Britos was born in Montevideo. He was part of the Uruguay national football team that won the 1950 FIFA World Cup, but did not play in any matches in the tournament. In total he earned 11 caps and scored 6 goals for Uruguay.

Career statistics

International

Honours
Peñarol
 Primera División (AUF): 1949, 1951, 1953

Real Madrid
 La Liga: 1953–54

Uruguay
 FIFA World Cup: 1950

References 

1926 births
1998 deaths
Footballers from Montevideo
Uruguayan footballers
Uruguayan expatriate footballers
Uruguay international footballers
1950 FIFA World Cup players
FIFA World Cup-winning players
Uruguayan Primera División players
Peñarol players
Real Madrid CF players
La Liga players
Expatriate footballers in Spain
Association football forwards
Club Guaraní managers